The white-bellied dacnis (Dacnis albiventris) is a species of bird in the family Thraupidae.
It is found in Brazil, Colombia, Ecuador, Peru, and Venezuela.
Its natural habitat is subtropical or tropical moist lowland forests.

References

Dacnis
Taxonomy articles created by Polbot
Birds described in 1852
Taxa named by Philip Sclater